Wendy E. N. Thomas (born 1958 or 1959) is an American microbiologist and politician who served in the New Hampshire House of Representatives from 2018 until 2020, representing Hillsborough County's 21st district, which contains the town of Merrimack. In 2018, Thomas, a local activist and member of the Democratic Party, successfully ran for the New Hampshire House of Representatives, receiving 6.5% of the vote in the multi-member constituency, placing 7th out of the 8 winning candidates. In 2020, Thomas ran for re-election in the 21st district; however, she was defeated in the general election, receiving 6.2% of the vote and placing 10th.

Following the death of incumbent Dick Hinch, Thomas ran in the April 2021 special election for the 21st district. Thomas was narrowly defeated in the general election by Merrimack town councilor William Boyd III, receiving 2,144 votes to Boyd's 2,531. In June 2022, Thomas declared her intent to run again for the 21st district in the 2022 New Hampshire House of Representatives election. Thomas was elected with 6.41% of the vote, placing 5th out of 8.

Thomas suffers from long COVID and has publicly advocated for more awareness for the condition.

References 

Democratic Party members of the New Hampshire House of Representatives
People from Merrimack, New Hampshire
21st-century American politicians
Date of birth missing (living people)
Year of birth uncertain
Place of birth missing (living people)
American microbiologists
21st-century American women politicians
21st-century American women scientists
University of Connecticut alumni
Sacred Heart University alumni
1950s births
Living people